Little Hans Andersen is a 1903 musical fairy pantomime in two acts and seven scenes for children with lyrics by Basil Hood and music by Walter Slaughter.

It was a revised version of Hood and Slaughter's pantomime Hans Andersen's Fairytales, based on the fairy tales of Hans Christian Andersen which had opened at Terry's Theatre in December 1897. After the last performance of the Savoy Opera A Princess of Kensington, produced by William Greet, the cast of the D'Oyly Carte Opera Company dispersed and many of them moved to the Adelphi Theatre to appear in the new musical comedy The Earl and the Girl (1903), also produced by Greet, where they next appeared in Little Hans Andersen from 23 December 1903 to 16 January 1904 for 23 matinee performances. Greet followed this with other productions at the Adelphi in which many of the same cast members appeared.

Cast

The Emperor Who Loved New Clothes – Walter Passmore
Real Soldier – Henry Lytton
Ole-Luc-Ole, The Dream Fairy – M. R. Morand
King of the Copper Castle – Richard Temple
Prince with the Magic Pipe – Robert Evett
Little Hans Andersen – Master Roy Lorraine
Han's Father, Merman – Powis Pinder
Royal Footman – Reginald Crompton
Royal Butler – Ernest Torrence
Prime Minister – Charles Childerstone
Two Wooden Soldiers – Reginald Crompton and Ernest Torrence
Witch – Rudolph Lewis
Princess Who Was Kissed by a Swineherd – Louie Pounds
Princess Who Married the Soldier – Agnes Fraser
Karen of the Red Shoes – Winifred Hart-Dyke
Royal Governess – Alice Barth
Queen – Rosina Brandram
Princess Whom Prince Married – Olive Rae
Mayor – Frank Elliston

References

Pantomime
1903 musicals
West End musicals
British musicals
Musicals based on works by Hans Christian Andersen